The Íslenskir Radíóamatörar, ÍRA, in English, Icelandic Radio Amateurs is a national non-profit organization for amateur radio enthusiasts in Iceland.  Key membership benefits of the IRA include the sponsorship of amateur radio operating awards and radio contests, and a QSL bureau for those members who regularly communicate with amateur radio operators in other countries.  IRA represents the interests of Icelandic amateur radio operators before Icelandic and international telecommunications regulatory authorities.  IRA publishes a monthly membership magazine called CQ TF.  IRA is the national member society representing Iceland in the International Amateur Radio Union.

See also 
International Amateur Radio Union

References 

Iceland
Organizations based in Iceland
Organizations based in Reykjavík
Organizations established in 1946
1946 establishments in Iceland
Radio in Iceland